Latobius was a sky and mountain Celtic god worshipped by the people of Noricum (modern Austria and Slovenia). During ancient Roman times he was equated with aspects of Jupiter and Mars. Votive inscriptions for Mars Latobius are typically found on mountain tops (e.g., on the highest peak of the Koralpe mountain range, between the Lavant and Mur valleys) and on passes in former Noricum.

Etymology
Xavier Delamarre proposed to derive the theonym Latobios from an earlier *Lātu-biyo- ('Furious Striker'), composed of the root lāto- ('furor, ardour'; cf. OIr. láth, Welsh lawd) attached to *biyo- ('strike'; cf. OIr. fu-bae 'harming').

References 

Bibliography

 Dictionary of Celtic Myth and Legend. Miranda Green. Thames and Hudson Ltd. London. 1997

Sky and weather gods
Gaulish gods
Mountain gods